The 2012–13 Loyola Marymount Lions men's basketball team represented Loyola Marymount University during the 2012–13. This was head coach Max Good's fifth season at Loyola Marymount. The Lions competed in the West Coast Conference and played their home games at Gersten Pavilion. They finished the season 11–23, 1–15 in WCC play to finish in last place. Despite only winning only one conference game during the regular season, they won three games during the WCC tournament to advance to the semifinals where they lost to #1 Gonzaga.

Before the season

Departures

Recruits

Dickinson will redshirt the 2012-13 season and begin play in the 2013-14 season as is required for a D1 Transfer by the NCAA.

Roster

Schedule and results

|-
!colspan=12 style="background:#00345B; color:#8E0028;"| Exhibition

|-
!colspan=12 style="background:#8E0028; color:#00345B;"| Regular season

|-

|-
!colspan=12 style="background:#FFFFFF; color:#8E0028;"| 2013 West Coast Conference men's basketball tournament

References

Loyola Marymount Lions men's basketball seasons
Loyola Marymount